Pseudopostega subviolacea is a moth of the family Opostegidae. It was described by Edward Meyrick in 1920. It is known from Gujarat, India.

References

Opostegidae
Moths described in 1920